"To Set It Right" is the 21st episode of the American military drama television series The Lieutenant, produced for broadcast on NBC. Written by Lee Erwin, and featuring a guest cast that included Dennis Hopper, Don Marshall, Woody Strode and the acting debut of Nichelle Nichols. The series followed the lives of members of the United States Marine Corps stationed at Marine Corps Base Camp Pendleton. In this episode, after a racially driven altercation between Cpl. Peter Devlin (Dennis Hopper) and Pvt. Ernest Cameron (Don Marshall), Lt. William Rice (Gary Lockwood) attempts to settle their issues by first arranging a boxing match, and then forcing them to work together on a march. Following protests by the Pentagon, who had previously aided the production of the series, the network refused to air the episode.

Production
The Lieutenant was developed in conjunction with the Pentagon; but following a series of plot points featuring in the series that concerned officials there, relations were strained. They were concerned with the plot of "To Set It Right", and warned the producers that the airing of the episode could result in the production no longer being able to use the equipment and extras provided by the Marines for free. In response, Roddenberry informed the National Association for the Advancement of Colored People, who attempted to pressure the network to air the episode. The assistance of the Pentagon was withdrawn, and the series was officially cancelled a week later.

Reception
Donald Bogle wrote of the episode in his 2001 book Primetime Blues: African Americans on Network Television, saying that the episode "lost its nerve and ultimately undermined the feelings - the very strong, modern Black perspective - of its character Cameron". This resulted in the character appearing to be "one more angry young negro with unjustified racial hostility". However, Bogle praised the interactions between Rice and Norma and said that this was a better articulation of the problems faced by Cameron than those explained by the actual character. Bogle felt that although "To Set It Right" sought to address racial issues, it wanted to avoid upsetting its main viewers.

A videotape of the episode is part of the  Paley Center for Media collection in New York, contributed by Gene Roddenberry.

Notes

References

External links
 

African-American-related controversies
Race and ethnicity in television
Race in the United States
Stereotypes of African Americans
Unaired television episodes